Long Lake is located in the Mogollon Rim area of the state of Arizona. The facilities are maintained by Coconino National Forest division of the USDA Forest Service. It is named after a legend of a long serpent type creature that was reportedly seen by ranchers as they herd cattle near the lake.

Fish species
 Rainbow Trout
 Largemouth Bass
 Sunfish
 Channel Catfish
 Northern Pike
 Walleye

References

External links
 Arizona Fishing Locations Map
 Arizona Boating Locations Facilities Map
 Video of Long Lake

Lakes of Arizona
Lakes of Coconino County, Arizona
Coconino National Forest